Francisco Machado Campos (born August 12, 1972) is a Mexican former professional baseball pitcher. He is a 15-time Mexican League All-Star and played with the Campeche Pirates for more than 20 seasons. He was born in Guaymas, Sonora.

Career
The top pitcher in the Mexican League in the early part of the 21st century, Francisco Campos was first signed by the Houston Astros in 1991 as a catcher. He only hit .147/~.275/.235 in 21 games for the GCL Astros. He missed the entire 1992 season with injuries and most of 1993. He moved to the Campeche Pirates in 1993 and batted .148/~.200/.174. After batting .278/.381/.333 in 19 games in 1994, he was converted to pitching.

In 1995, Campos had a 1.93 ERA in 5 outings, then became a regular starter in '96 and styled a 10-3 record and 2.49 ERA, 8th in the Liga. In 1997, the 24-year-old hurler had a 9-10, 2.92 record. He improved to 13-6, 2.88 in 1998 and almost doubled his strikeout total from 70 to 130. He was 10th in the LMB in ERA, tied for fifth in wins and second to Ravelo Manzanillo in strikeouts.

In '99, Campos had an off-year (6-11, 3.71) and was 11-4, 3.10 in 2000 with 172 K in 189 innings. He was third in the Liga in ERA and second to Manzanillo in strikeouts. His 1.79 ERA in the 2000-01 Mexican Pacific League was second to Eleazar Mora and he followed with a 10-7, 3.19 year with Campeche.

The 2001–2002 winter league season was another fine one as Campos went 5-2 with a 1.66 ERA, lowest in the LMP and he led with 89 Ks. In the LMB, he went 8-9, 3.45 in 2002 but was signed by the Milwaukee Brewers. Reporting to the Indianapolis Indians, he had a 3-0, 2.05 record in 4 appearances, allowing a .180 average and 14 K to 1 BB in 22 IP but did not get called up.

He went 3-3 with a 2.25 ERA and a LMP-high 76 strikeouts in 2002–2003. That year, he was 6-4 with a 2.40 ERA for Campeche and only 2-4, 5.72 with Indianapolis. In the 2003 Pan American Games, Campos allowed a sacrifice fly to Paul Janish, scoring Seth Smith in the 14th inning of the semifinals as Mexico lost a tough game to the US and Huston Street. It knocked Mexico out of the gold medal game as they settled for Bronze. Campos began his best run in the 2003–2004 winter ball season. For the Mazatlán Deer, he was 10-2 with a 2.19 ERA and 68 strikeouts to take the LMP pitching Triple Crown and made Baseball America's winter league All-Star team. He pitched six scoreless innings in the 2004 Caribbean Series. Then, he went 12-2 with a 1.47 ERA and 99 K in 123 IP in the LMB season to take the pitching Triple Crown there as well, the first such winner in 48 years since Francisco Ramirez had done it. Campos's ERA was 1.22 lower than runner-up Osvaldo Fernández, he struck out 19 more than Leonardo González and José Silva tied him for the win lead. He led Campeche to the pennant that year. Going to the Chicago White Sox system, he went 2-3 with a 4.26 ERA for the Charlotte Knights.

After a 7-2, 3.29 year in winter ball, he helped Mexico to the 2005 Caribbean Series title by going 2-0, 1.13 with 23 K and 3 BB in 16 IP. He was again named to the Baseball America winter league All-Star team and won the deciding game in the Series. In the regular season, Francisco went 11-4 with a 2.84 ERA and 170 K in 152 innings. He led the Liga in Ks (73 more than runner-up Alonso Beltrán) and ERA (.41 lower than runner-up Eric Knott).

He was picked to represent Mexico in the 2006 World Baseball Classic; manager Frank Estrada was criticized for not using him more, but he was the club's least effective pitcher with a 7.20 ERA, though he won his lone decision. Campos was shaky early in the 2006 season, failing to make the 2006 Mets out of spring training and going 6-5 with a 3.84 ERA for Campeche. In his 14th year there, he was dealt away to the Monterrey Sultans, where he went 5-0 with a 3.00 ERA for the Liga's top team, though they fell in the finals. In the 2006 Central American and Caribbean Games, Francisco went 1-1 with an 8.10 ERA but Mexico still won a Bronze.

Campos was 9-4 with a 3.08 ERA for Campeche in 2007 and finished 5th in the LMB in ERA. In the 2007 Pan-American Games, he got the no-decision in a Mexican win over Venezuela, then allowed just 2 runs to Team USA but got little support from a lineup with three major leaguers and many AAA veterans, losing a 2-1 decision. He was 0-1 with a 2.19 ERA for the Bronze Medal winners.

Campos was 1-0 with a 3.48 ERA in the 2008 Final Olympic Qualification Tournament. In 10 innings, he struck out 22 and walked no one. He easily led in strikeouts, 6 ahead of Min-han Son and 12 ahead of anyone else. He got most of his K's in one game against the South African national team, whiffing 18 in 8 innings, allowing only two hits. Mexico failed to advance to the 2008 Olympics.

In 2008, Francisco was 11-5 with a 2.41 ERA for Campeche, whiffing 115 and allowing 118 hits in 149 IP. He tied Felix Villegas for the league lead in strikeouts, tied for 4th in wins and second to Juan Delgadillo in ERA.

In the 2008 Americas Baseball Cup, Campos was 1-1 with a 3.38 ERA and had the most balks (2) while being the worst of Mexico's 4 starters (the others were Walter Silva, Oscar Rivera and Pablo Ortega). Mexico still advanced to the 2009 Baseball World Cup. Campos's loss came by a 2-1 decision to Josué Matos and Puerto Rico.

Campos went 0-1 in the 2009 World Baseball Classic, allowing 8 hits and 7 runs in 4 IP. He entered a game with Australia with a 7-4 lead and tossed two scoreless innings but gave up 3 runs in the 5th to tie the game. He then came into the game with Cuba ahead 2-1 in the third, replacing Pablo Ortega. He gave up a leadoff single to Rolando Meriño, who advanced on a ground out by Luis Miguel Navas and came home on a two-out single by Michel Enríquez to tie the score. Mexico scored in the 4th but Cuba rallied in the bottom of the inning on a hit by Yosvani Peraza and homer by Yulieski Gourriel to take the lead for good. Campos took the loss.

Campos has made 15 All-Star Game appearances throughout his time in the Mexican League, and was the starting pitcher in 5 of those games. He was also recently awarded the LMB's "Comeback Player of the Year" in 2016. On July 2, 2019, Campos recorded his 200th victory in a game against the Algodoneros de Unión Laguna and subsequently retired as an active player after achieving the feat. Only 14 other pitchers in the LMB have reached the same milestone. He thus finished his career in the Mexican League with a record of 200–148, a 3.35 ERA and 2,181 strikeouts across 3,038.1 innings pitched.

Following his retirement, Campos was named manager of the Piratas de Campeche for the 2020 season.

Sources
Sources include: 
1992–2006 Baseball Almanacs
 The Mexican League: Comprehensive Player Statistics by Pedro Treto Cisneros
 Viva Beisbol newsletter by Bruce Baskin
 "Unsung heroes bound to emerge" by Jim Street on mlb.com, 2/10/06
 Worldbaseballclassic.com
 Minorleaguebaseball.com
 IBAF site
 2006 Central American and Caribbean Games

External links

1972 births
Living people
Alacranes de Campeche players
Baseball players at the 2003 Pan American Games
Baseball players at the 2007 Pan American Games
Baseball players from Sonora
Central American and Caribbean Games silver medalists for Mexico
Central American and Caribbean Games bronze medalists for Mexico
Charlotte Knights players
Competitors at the 2006 Central American and Caribbean Games
Competitors at the 2010 Central American and Caribbean Games
Gulf Coast Astros players
Indianapolis Indians players
Mexican expatriate baseball players in the United States
Mexican League baseball pitchers
Naranjeros de Hermosillo players
Pan American Games bronze medalists for Mexico
Pan American Games medalists in baseball
People from Guaymas
Piratas de Campeche players
Sultanes de Monterrey players
Tomateros de Culiacán players
Venados de Mazatlán players
2006 World Baseball Classic players
2009 World Baseball Classic players
Central American and Caribbean Games medalists in baseball
Medalists at the 2003 Pan American Games
Medalists at the 2007 Pan American Games